The Count of Monte Cristo is a British 12-part dramatization of Alexandre Dumas's 1844 novel of the same name. It was made by the BBC and was screened in the autumn of 1964. The series starred Alan Badel in the title role.

As well as being the only BBC version, the serial survived the corporation's junking policy intact and is available on DVD.

Premise
Edmond Dantes, a sailor, is falsely accused and imprisoned by three men who have various reasons to be jealous of him. After 14 years imprisoned in the Chateau d'If he escapes, and, after recovering a treasure hidden on the island of Monte Cristo revealed to him by the Abbe Faria, a fellow prisoner, he embarks on a campaign of revenge against those who have wronged him.

Cast
 Alan Badel as Edmond Dantes
 Natasha Parry as Mercédès
 Philip Madoc as Fernand Mondego
 Morris Perry as Danglars
 Michael Gough as Villefort
 Michael Robbins as Caderousse
 Anthony Newlands as M. Morel 
 John Wentworth as Abbe Faria
 David Calderisi as Jacopo
 Cyril Shaps as Bertuccio 
 Rosalie Crutchley as Mme. Danglars
 Patricia English as Mme. Villefort
 Sandor Eles as Albert Morcerf
 Isobel Black as Eugenie Danglars
 Anna Palk as Valentine Villefort
 Edward de Souza as Maximilian Morel
 Austin Trevor as Cavalcanti 
 Richard Kay as Benedetto
 Valerie Sarruf as Haydee

Production
The series was made in 12 episodes of 25 minutes each, with a total run time of 300 minutes. It was filmed in black and white and had an intense, theatrical style. The script remained largely faithful to the original plot, and is regarded as the best screen version of the story, with Badel as the definitive Count.
The series was produced by Campbell Logan, and directed by Peter Hammond. The screenplay was by Anthony Steven.

It is unknown if the production was broadcast live with pre-film inserts or if it was broadcast from 405-line videotapes which were wiped at a later date, although all episodes survive as 35mm telerecordings.

Episodes

References

External links
 

1960s British drama television series
BBC television dramas
Black-and-white British television shows
Television shows based on The Count of Monte Cristo
Television series set in the 1810s
Television series set in the 1820s
Television series set in the 1830s